Sir Richard Atwood Glass (1820 – 22 December 1873) was an English telegraph cable manufacturer and a Conservative politician who sat in the House of Commons from 1868 to 1869.

Biography
Glass was born in Bradford-on-Avon, Wiltshire, in Southern England, the son of Francis Glass. He was educated at King's College London.  In 1846 with George Elliot, he provided capital for an insolvent wire-rope manufacturers Heimann & Kuper, and by 1851 the firm was trading as Glass, Elliott & Company. The company produced submarine communications cables and in 1854 ran a circuit from Denmark to Sweden and undertook the manufacture of long cables for the French Mediterranean Telegraph Company of J W Brett. The cables with a resin-insulated conducting wire protected by an armour of iron wire proved to be long-lasting, and in the later 1850s the company introduced anti-corrosive compounds to coat the finished cable. The firm merged with the Gutta-Percha Company in 1864, and Glass became managing director of the resulting Telegraph Construction & Maintenance Company. Glass's company provided half of the first transatlantic telegraph cable and all the cable laid by the Great Eastern in 1866. Glass was knighted for these services on 26 November 1867.

In the 1868 general election Glass was elected Member of Parliament for Bewdley. He was unseated on 16 February 1869 when the election was declared void.

Glass lived at Ashurst in Dorking, Surrey. He died on 22 December 1873, aged 53, of chronic Bright's disease at his home at South Stoneham, Hampshire.

References

External links

1820 births
1873 deaths
UK MPs 1868–1874
Alumni of King's College London
Conservative Party (UK) MPs for English constituencies
Deaths from nephritis